"Karera" (Carrera) is a song recorded by Serbian pop recording artist Dara Bubamara. It was self-released 13 October 2014. The song was written by Stefan Đurić and Slobodan Veljković. It was produced and recorded in Belgrade.

The song's title comes from the Porsche Carrera car. The music video premiered the same day as the song and featured Bubamara dancing on top of her white Carrera in a transparent blouse and fishnet stockings. Serbian newspaper Telegraf said that the video looked "more like a commercial for a German car" than a music video. Bubamara said the song was "autobiographical" and that the lyrics refers to her "enemies and some journalists". Before its release, Bubamara said that Karera would "go above modern standards."

References

External links
Karera at Discogs
Karera at iTunes

2014 singles
2014 songs
Music videos shot in Belgrade
Serbian pop songs